Charles Willsie Congdon (November 12, 1909 – February 28, 1965) was an American professional golfer from the Pacific Northwest whose career spanned four decades: 1930s–1960s.

Congdon was the club professional at Tacoma Country and Golf Club from 1935 to 1965. During World War II, he worked as an aircraft plant inspector in Tacoma. Congdon was instrumental in forming the Pacific Northwest Section PGA and served three terms as president. He also served as a vice-president of the PGA of America from 1955–1957.

Congdon was the recipient of several honors. The Hudson Cup Matches are conducted by the Pacific Northwest Section of the PGA of America in cooperation with the Oregon and Washington State Golf Associations. The award given to the top amateur, the Charles Congdon Award, is named in his honor.  The Pacific Northwest Section PGA elected him Golf Professional of the Year. He was inducted into the organization's Hall of Fame in 1981. He was inducted into the State of Washington Sports Hall of Fame in 1978.

Professional wins (20)

PGA Tour wins (2)

Other wins
this list is probably incomplete
1936 Pacific Northwest PGA Championship
1938 Pacific Northwest PGA Championship
1939 Washington Open
1946 British Columbia Open
1947 Oregon Open, Washington Open, Pacific Northwest PGA Championship
1948 British Columbia Open
1950 Washington Open, Pacific Northwest PGA Championship
1951 British Columbia Open
1952 Washington Open, Pacific Northwest PGA Championship, British Columbia Open
1953 British Columbia Open
1956 British Columbia Open
1962 Washington Open
1963 Pacific Northwest PGA Championship

References

American male golfers
PGA Tour golfers
Golfers from Washington (state)
People from Blaine, Washington
Sportspeople from Tacoma, Washington
1909 births
1965 deaths